Vivos may refer to:

Vivos (album)
Vivos (film), a 2020 German-Mexican documentary film
Vivos (underground shelter)
Vivo Class - a school reward system

See also
Inter vivos